Grant Garvey (born 17 September 1996) is an Australian professional rugby league footballer who plays for the Newtown Jets in the Intrust Super Premiership NSW. He previously played for the Sydney Roosters in the National Rugby League.

Background
Born in Sydney, New South Wales, Garvey is of Indigenous Australian descent and played his junior rugby league for La Perouse United and South Eastern Seagulls. He was then signed by the Sydney Roosters.

Garvey is the younger brother of Sydney Roosters player Craig Garvey.

Playing career

Early career
From 2014 to 2016, Garvey played for the Sydney Roosters' NYC team. On 8 July 2015, he played for the New South Wales under-20s team against the Queensland under-20s team.

2016
On 13 July Garvey played for the New South Wales under-20s team against the Queensland under-20s team for a second year in a row. In Round 22 of the 2016 NRL season, he made his NRL debut for the Roosters against the Penrith Panthers. He captained the 2016 Sydney Roosters Holden Cup Premiership winning side.

References

External links
Sydney Roosters profile
NRL profile

1996 births
Australian rugby league players
Indigenous Australian rugby league players
Sydney Roosters players
Rugby league hookers
Living people
Rugby league players from Sydney